The Gmini is a series of portable audio and video players released by Archos in 2004 and 2005.

Portable Video

Gmini 400
The first audio device to hold a color LCD screen as well as photo, audio and video playback capacities, the Gmini 400 was introduced October 2004. 

The player featured MP3, WMA and WAV playback facilities and also loaded user-placed, APIC album covers on the display while the appropriate song was playing. The device was ID3 Tag compatible, and organized users music collection by reading this meta-data. This feature, called ARCLibrary, was intended to provide non-tech savvy users of the device a simple means of organizing audio collection.

The device contained an MPEG-4 player, enabling users to watch MPEG-4 encoded video files in DivX AVI format. The Gmini 400 also had an image viewer compatible with PNG, BMP and JPEG image file formates. There is also functionality built in within the device to play games available from the manufacturer's website.

In addition to these other features, the Archos Gmini 400 contained a CompactFlash reader enabling the user to slot in a memory card, increasing the unit's capacity, play files stored within the card, and transfer files from the card to the unit. It was not possible to transfer files from the Gmini 400 to the CompactFlash card, presumably to discourage sharing of media files amongst Gmini users.

This device was first released Tuesday, August 31, 2004, and weighs 160 g.

Gmini 402
The Gmini 402 is the next model up from the Gmini 400. Featuring PlaysForSure compatibility, the owners of this model can download purchased, protected music, in WMA format, and play them back on the device. This player supports DRM protected WMV video files, as well as MP3, WMA, AVI, JPG, PNG, and BMP.

As with the Gmini 400, the unit also displays images with its built-in image viewer. The Gmini 402 also connects to an external audio source for out-aloud listening, and also connects to external video sources too, for watching videos from the device on televisions, etc.

The player includes a built-in game engine, Mophun, for 3D style games. 

Playback autonomy on the device is stated at 4 hours, when viewing videos, and up to 10 hours when listening to music. This depends on the usage of the device, such as reading/writing/copying or deleting files.

The unit connects to a personal computer as a "USB Mass Storage Device" for drag and drop mobility.

This player was released on Tuesday, July 12, 2005, and weighs 160 g.

This player, along with a couple AV series players, were sold by Dish Networks under the PocketDish brand as the AV402E.

Gmini 402 Camcorder
The camera is 1.2MP (Megapixel), and has video recording capabilities, with up to a 2x digital zoom. The player also holds 3 resolution modes, which enables users to choose size over quality, as well as recording directly into MPEG4 in VGA resolution.

The Gmini 402 Camcorder is Microsoft Windows and Apple Macintosh compatible, and is recognized instantly as a "Mass Storage Device". 

This unit plays AVI, WMV, MP3, WMA, DRM WMV, WAV, JPG, BMP and PNG.

This unit was first released Friday, November 11, 2005, and weighs 160 g.

Gmini 500
Just after the release of the AV500, the Archos Gmini 500 was born. This device, along with a lot of Archos' latest devices, has full support for Windows Media's PlaysForSure system which allows users play DRM restricted music.

This unit is classed more as an "entertainment centre" than an MP3 player, and  includes a built in speaker for listening out aloud. Even though the speaker may not be the best quality, there is also functionality to be able to connect the device up to an existing external Hi-Fi system and listen outward that way.

The player supports all the standard formats, and also contains a photo viewer - images and videos can be viewed on the 4" colour screen within the unit. The Gmini 500 is fully USB 2.0 compliant.

This device was released Tuesday 20 December 2005, and weighs 320 g.

Homebrew
A firmware exploit discovered by user GliGli provided the possibility for product enhancement by the community of Gmini 400 enthusiasts. The Gmini 400 has become a haven for emulator gaming, with an emulator for Sega Master System/Sega Game Gear, Nintendo Game Boy/Game Boy Color, Nintendo Entertainment System. There is also a Sega Genesis emulator for the Gmini 402 named "pico", possibly a port of PicoDrive which has also been ported to other portable devices.

Since then GliGli has ported the applications to the Gmini 402 and 402 Camcorder. They, along with other homebrew applications including Doom, have now been embedded into the fan made operating system named "MediOS" for the Gmini's and other Archos players.

Portable Audio

Gmini XS 202
The Gmini XS 202 was a popular model supplied from Archos. This model supported MP3, WMA, protected WMA, and WAV files, and also contains what's known as ARCLibrary, a feature that organizes all digital media on Archos devices.  The model also supports gapless playback and Windows Media PlaysForSure standards, so purchased music can be synchronized with the player. The Gmini XS 202 is Microsoft Windows and Apple Macintosh compatible, and uses the USB 2.0 interface to transfer music to its 20 GB built in hard drive.

The player is also ID3 tag compatible.

The Archos Gmini XS 202 was released on Friday, October 28, 2005, and weighs 120 g.

Gmini XS 100
The XS 100 group of players features a 1.5" screen, full PlaysForSure capabilities, and supports MP3, WMA, protected WMA, and WAV files. It also features the ARCLibrary for organizing media files within one's media collection.

Like the above player, the Gmini XS 100 players boasts functionality with Microsoft Windows and Apple Macintosh, and uses the USB 2.0 interface to transfer music quickly.

They come in 4 colours, Ice Grey, Volcanic Black, Funky Pink and Techno Blue. The devices are 3 GB or 4 GB.

The Archos Gmini XS 101 was released on Friday, November 12, 2004, and weighs 120 g.

Gmini XS 200
Archos' Gmini XS 200 is a previous model to the XS 202, with a monochrome screen, no PlaysForSure support, and a 20 GB hard drive.

The Archos Gmini XS 200 was released on Thursday, October 14, 2004, and weighs 120 g.

Gmini 120
This particular model plays MP3, WMA and WAV files. It cannot play DRM-protected WMA files. Its capacity is 20 GB.

This model also uses the ARCLibrary to organize music and media on the device. There is also a browser feature within the unit to enable users to copy, move, and rename files, and has a battery life of 10 hours.

The Gmini 120 features a built-in microphone and a line-in jack, and can record audio straight to MP3 format (112kbs from microphone, 192kbs from line-in jack. Both constant bit rate).

There is a slot in the top of the device that accepts CompactFlash cards. This allows digital camera images (or any files) to be uploaded to the device, thus reducing the requirement of carrying round many memory cards. The device does not support image viewing, however.

This player was released November 1, 2003, and weighs 244 g.

There is also an optional FM radio attachment available for this player so users can play and record directly from FM radio.

A version of this player was released as the Archos Gmini SP.

See also
 Archos AV Series

References

External links
Manufacturer's Website
Open Source Firmware for some Gmini players (link is broken since 02/02/2012, domain name expired)

Digital audio players
Portable media players